Phragmataecia is a genus of moths belonging to the family Cossidae. Members of this genus are found throughout the world apart from North America.

Description
Members of this genus are generally medium-sized with very long abdomens, especially in females, and long bipectinate antennae. In males the length of pecten abruptly shortens to the distal part of tip, while in females pecten length is short to the tip of antenna as near invisible papilla. Coloration is white to black with unexpressed wing patterns except small black dots between the vein of the forewing in females.

Distribution
The genus consists of 39 species distributed in the Old World excluding the Papuan and Australian ranges.

Species

Phragmataecia albida
Phragmataecia andarana
Phragmataecia anikini
Phragmataecia annapurna
Phragmataecia brunni
Phragmataecia castaneae
Phragmataecia cinnamomea
Phragmataecia dushman
Phragmataecia furia
Phragmataecia fusca
Phragmataecia fuscifusa
Phragmataecia geisha
Phragmataecia gummata
Phragmataecia gurkoi
Phragmataecia hummeli
Phragmataecia impura
Phragmataecia innominata
Phragmataecia innotata
Phragmataecia irrorata
Phragmataecia itremo
Phragmataecia laszloi
Phragmataecia longivitta
Phragmataecia minima
Phragmataecia minor
Phragmataecia monika
Phragmataecia okovangae
Phragmataecia pacifica
Phragmataecia parvipuncta
Phragmataecia pectinicornis
Phragmataecia pelostema
Phragmataecia psyche
Phragmataecia purpureus
Phragmataecia pygmaea
Phragmataecia roborowskii
Phragmataecia saccharum
Phragmataecia sericeata
Phragmataecia sumatrensis
Phragmataecia terebrifer
Phragmataecia turkmenbashi

References

External links
 Retrieved April 23, 2018.

 
Moth genera
Taxa named by Edward Newman